The 1968 Washington Huskies football team was an American football team that represented the University of Washington during the 1968 NCAA University Division football season.  In its 12th season under head coach Jim Owens, the team compiled a 3–5–2 record, finished in last place in the Pacific-8 Conference, and was outscored 177 to 154.

Halfback Jim Cope and cornerback Al Worley were the team captains.

This was the first season of AstroTurf at Husky Stadium; the opener was a tie  The only other University Division venues with artificial turf in 1968 were the Astrodome (Houston), Neyland Stadium (Tennessee), and Camp Randall Stadium (Wisconsin).

Schedule

Roster

NFL/AFL Draft selections
Two University of Washington Huskies were selected in the 1969 NFL/AFL draft, which lasted seventeen rounds with 442 selections.

References

External links
 Official game program: Washington vs. Washington State at Spokane – November 23, 1968

Washington
Washington Huskies football seasons
Washington Huskies football